Barry Eugene DuVal (born August 7, 1959) is an American politician from Virginia. He was first elected to the City Council of Newport News, Virginia in 1988, and in 1990 was elected mayor,  serving in that role until 1996. He has also served as the President and CEO of the Hampton Roads Partnership, a group that brings together the cities and counties of the Hampton Roads area with local universities and businesses in order to promote the region's economic interests. His service in this field led then-Governor Jim Gilmore to appoint DuVal to be his Secretary of Commerce and Trade, a position he held from 1998 until 2001. After long being considered a Republican frontrunner to succeed Herbert H. Bateman, DuVal surprised many in 2000 when he decided to drop out of the race for Congress in Virginia's 1st congressional district. Jo Ann Davis went on to win the seat. In April 2010, DuVal was named President & CEO of the Virginia Chamber of Commerce.

References

1959 births
Living people
Mayors of Newport News, Virginia
State cabinet secretaries of Virginia
Virginia city council members
Virginia Republicans
James Madison University alumni